Nassau is a former Verbandsgemeinde ("collective municipality") in the Rhein-Lahn-Kreis, in Rhineland-Palatinate, Germany. In January 2019 it was merged into the new Verbandsgemeinde Bad Ems-Nassau. Its seat was in Nassau.

The Verbandsgemeinde Nassau consisted of the following Ortsgemeinden ("local municipalities"):

Former Verbandsgemeinden in Rhineland-Palatinate
Rhein-Lahn-Kreis